The Sulphur Trestle Fort Site is a historic Civil War battle site near Elkmont, Alabama.  The fort was the site of the Battle of Sulphur Creek Trestle on September 25, 1864.  After defeating Union Army forces and recapturing Athens, Alabama, Confederate General Nathan Bedford Forrest moved north to attempt to destroy a key railroad trestle.  The trestle was defended by a fortification manned by 1000 Union soldiers.  Forrest's troops easily defeated the Union forces and burned the trestle.  Today, about 400 yards (370 m) of trenches dug around the outside of the fort's parapet remain.  The site was listed on the National Register of Historic Places in 1973.

References

National Register of Historic Places in Limestone County, Alabama
Buildings and structures completed in 1864
Forts on the National Register of Historic Places in Alabama
American Civil War battlefields
American Civil War forts
Alabama in the American Civil War
American Civil War on the National Register of Historic Places
Trestle bridges in the United States
Forts in Alabama